NA-160 Bahawalnagar-I is a constituency for the National Assembly of Pakistan.

Election 2002 

General elections were held on 10 Oct 2002. Syed Muhammad Asgher Shah of PML-Q won by 77,362 votes.

Election 2008 

General elections were held on 18 Feb 2008. Muhammad Akhtar Khadim Alias of PML-Q won by 52,981 votes.

Election 2013 

General elections were held on 11 May 2013. Syed Muhammad Asghar of PML-N won by 90,537 votes and became the  member of National Assembly.

Election 2018 

General elections are scheduled to be held on 25 July 2018.

See also
NA-159 Vehari-IV
NA-161 Bahawalnagar-II

References

External links 
Election result's official website

NA-188